Telesphorus can refer to:

 Telesphorus (general), 4th century BC general in ancient Greece
 Pope Telesphorus (died c. 137), Catholic pope and Catholic and Orthodox saint
 Telesphorus of Cosenza, a name assumed by a 14th-century pseudo-prophet during the time of the Western Schism
 Telesphorus (mythology), an ancient Greek minor god

See also
 Télesphore (disambiguation)
 Telesforo, a given name

Masculine given names